A joiner is a type of woodworker.

Joiner may also refer to:

Joiner (surname)
Joiner, Arkansas, a town in the United States
Biscuit joiner, a woodworking tool
A defector to the British side during the Second Boer War
Joiners (photographic technique), a photo-collage technique
 A joiner is one of various typographic control characters
 Zero-width joiner
 Combining grapheme joiner

See also 
 Joinery
 Join (disambiguation)
 Joyner (disambiguation)